Tükəvilə is a village and municipality in the Lankaran Rayon of Azerbaijan. It has a population of 1,344.

References

Populated places in Lankaran District